A chief marketing officer (CMO), also called a global marketing officer or marketing director, or chief brand officer, is a corporate executive responsible for managing marketing activities in an organization. Whilst historically these titles may have signified a legal responsibility, for example at Companies House in the UK, the titles are less strict/formal in the 21st Century and allow companies to acknowledge the evolving and increasingly significant role that marketers can play in an organisation, not least because of the inherent character of successful marketers. The CMO leads brand management, marketing communications (including advertising, promotions and public relations), market research, product marketing, distribution channel management, pricing, customer success, and customer service.

The CMO is a member of the C-suite and typically reports to the chief executive officer. A number of senior vice presidents, vice presidents, directors, and other senior marketing managers responsible for various parts of the marketing strategy may report directly to the CMO.

A study from consulting firm Spencer Stuart in 2021 showed that women made up 47% of CMO positions in 2020, an increase from the 43% reported in 2019. 13% of CMOs had racially or ethnically diverse background in 2020, down from 14% in 2019.

Responsibilities 
The day-to-day tasks and responsibilities are often categorically different from one another, due to the fluid nature of the CMO's skill set: language is needed to stitch together all aspects of the company. Thus, in a given day the CMO completes tasks that fall into many different categories:

 Analytical tasks, such as pricing and market research
 Creative tasks, such as graphic design, advertising and product, and service promotion
 Interpersonal tasks, such as coordinating with other company executives in creating alignment on strategy and execution plans

The CMO must quickly react to the changing market conditions and competitive dynamics and must reshape, as needed, the company's strategy and execution plans based on real-time market scenarios. Each of these products comes from a different department, so the CMO must be a nexus of information: it is a highly receptive role, with involvement in departments such as production, information technology, corporate communications, documentation, public relations, law, human resources, and finance.
In the 21st century, digitalization and the rise of consumer-centric marketing has changed the role of the CMO. They are now typically finding themselves handling customer-facing technology implementations in addition to the above tasks. One analyst predicted that in the future  CMOs will spend more on IT than their counterpart CIOs. According to another analyst firm, few senior-executive positions will be subject to as much change over the next few years as that of the chief marketing officer.

Peers to the CMO include chief human resources officer, chief technology officer, chief financial officer, chief communications officer, chief procurement officer, chief information officer, and general counsel.

Challenges
The CMO is responsible for facilitating growth, sales and marketing strategy. They must work towards objectives such as revenue generation, cost reduction, or risk mitigation. The unpredictable effect of marketing efforts, coupled with the need to drive profits, often leads to a short tenure for most CMOs. Consulting firm Spencer Stuart revealed average CMO tenure in 2020 was 40 months (a little over 3 years), which was the lowest in a decade. This compared with average CEO tenure of 7 years indicates challenge for CMOs to drive long-term growth.

In a CMO mapping study done by Raines, CMOs are losing their influence (73% of Fortune 250 companies have a Global CMO, but only 44% of Global CMOs sit in the C-suite). CMOs don't feel valued (23% of surveyed Fortune 500 CMOs were unsure their CEO understood their job). CMOs don't have clear alignment with their CEOs on key performance metrics (42% of surveyed Fortune 500 CMOs considered "Topline Revenue Growth" a top priority) whereas "topline growth" is typically one of the major priorities for CEOs at any stage of a business.

CMOs see customer loyalty as their top priority in the digital era; their second priority is to design experiences for tablets and mobile apps.

See also
 Digital strategy manager
 Chief web officer

References

Further reading

External links
 

Management occupations

Corporate titles